Rolf Dahlgrün (19 May 1908 – 19 December 1969) was a German politician of the Free Democratic Party (FDP). From 1962 to 1966, he was the Minister of Finance.

Dahlgrün studied law. He worked since 1936 for the Phönix Gummiwerke AG in Hamburg-Harburg. 

Before 1945, Dahlgrün was a member of the Nazi Party. In 1949, he became a member of the FDP. From 1953 to 1957, he was a member of the Hamburgische Bürgerschaft. From 1957 to 1969, he was a member of the Bundestag. From 1962 to 1966, he was Minister of Finance.

Some weeks before he died, he was elected as chairman of the German chapter of World Wildlife Fund.

See also
List of German finance ministers

References

1900s births
1967 deaths
Nazi Party members
Politicians from Hanover
People from the Province of Hanover
Members of the Bundestag for Hamburg
Members of the Bundestag 1965–1969
Members of the Bundestag 1961–1965
Members of the Bundestag 1957–1961
Federal government ministers of Germany
Finance ministers of Germany
Members of the Hamburg Parliament
Grand Crosses with Star and Sash of the Order of Merit of the Federal Republic of Germany
Members of the Bundestag for the Free Democratic Party (Germany)